Atar is a nagari (village) in Padang Ganting, Tanah Datar Regency, in the Indonesian province of West Sumatra, with a population of just under 5,000 people.

Geography and administration
It is the larger nagari, although less populated, making up  out of  area of Padang Ganting. Atar is further subdivided into three  or neighborhoods: Lareh Nan Panjang, Taratak VIII, and Taratak XII. 

In the past, Atar was merged with Padang Ganting as one nagari, although it later split off. During the Padri War, Muslim clerical forces based in Atar would launch raids against traditional Minangkabau aristocrats in Padang Ganting.

Demographics
Atar has a population of 4,908 in 2019 according to Statistics Indonesia, making up 1,393 households. The gender ratio is 92. The largest proportion of the workforce is employed in agriculture, with natural rubber being a common commodity.

Economy
There is a large diaspora of migrants from Atar, especially in West Java, which engage in the photocopier industry - namely, operating photocopy shops typically serving government offices and schools/universities. It was estimated that out of around 3,000 migrants from Atar, nearly all are engaged in the trade, and there is a monument of a photocopier to commemorate the tradition in the nagari.

Facilities
There are five public elementary schools in Atar, and one middle school, although there are no high schools, with the only one in the district being located in Padang Ganting nagari. There are also three  in the nagari.

References

Villages in West Sumatra